The 2014 Women's County One-Day Championship was the 18th cricket Women's County Championship season. It ran from May to September and saw 33 county teams and teams representing Ireland, Scotland, Wales and the Netherlands compete in a series of divisions. Kent Women won the County Championship as winners of the top division, with Surrey finishing runners-up. The Championship was Kent's sixth title, and their third in four seasons.

Competition format 
Teams played matches within a series of divisions with the winners of the top division being crowned County Champions. Matches were played using a one day format with 50 overs per side.

The championship worked on a points system, the winner being the team with most average points of completed games in the first division. The points are awarded as follows:

Win: 10 points + bonus points. 
Tie:  5 points + bonus points. 
Loss: Bonus points.
Abandoned or cancelled: Match not counted to average.

Bonus points are awarded for various batting and bowling milestones. The bonus points for each match are retained if the match is completed.

Batting

1.50 runs per over (RPO) or more: 1 point
2 RPO or more: 2 points
3 RPO or more: 3 points
4 RPO or more: 4 points

Bowling

3-4 wickets taken: 1 point
5-6 wickets taken: 2 points
7-8 wickets taken: 3 points
9-10 wickets taken: 4 points

Teams
The 2014 Championship was divided into four divisions: Divisions One to Three with nine teams apiece and Division Four with two groups of five.

Teams in each group played each other once.

Division One 

Source: ECB Women's County Championship

Division Two 

Source: ECB Women's County Championship

Division Three 

Source: ECB Women's County Championship

Division Four

North & East 

Source: ECB Women's County Championship

South & West 

Source: ECB Women's County Championship

Promotion play-offs 
The teams finishing second in Divisions Two and Three played against the teams finishing second bottom in Divisions One and Two, respectively, for the chance of promotion. The winners of the two Division Four groups played off for promotion to Division Three.

Statistics

Most runs

Source: CricketArchive

Most wickets

Source: CricketArchive

References 

 
2014
2014 in Scottish cricket
cricket
cricket
cricket